Ogba Zoo (also known as Ogba Zoo & Nature Park) is a state-owned zoological park in Benin City, capital of Edo State, Nigeria.

The nature park was established in 1971 in a forest reserve in the Ogba District, four kilometers from the town center.

The area covers 750 acres of land and water, and is home to local and other wild species, including primates, lions, giant tortoises, rock pythons, equine and antelope species.

Information and Culture Minister Lai Mohammed described the zoo as one of Nigeria's top tourist destinations.

Incidents
On September 25, 2017, the zoo was attacked by gunmen who killed three policemen and abducted the zoo's director, Andy Ehanire.

Beyond the attack incident, the zoo has moved to strengthen its security architecture through collaboration with relevant security outfits and agencies. It has ever since then, moved on to be a safe haven, receiving visitors and tourists from all over Nigeria.

See also
 List of zoos

References

Zoos in Nigeria
Zoos established in 1965
1965 establishments in Nigeria